Tripteridia is a genus of moths in the family Geometridae.

Species
Tripteridia acroscotia
Tripteridia albimixta
Tripteridia barbata
Tripteridia caesiata
Tripteridia cavilinea
Tripteridia commixtilinea
Tripteridia conquadrata
Tripteridia decens
Tripteridia dilopha
Tripteridia dinosia
Tripteridia dympna
Tripteridia dystacta
Tripteridia ectocosma
Tripteridia eusemozona
Tripteridia euthynsis
Tripteridia expectans
Tripteridia fletcheri
Tripteridia fulgurans
Tripteridia hypocalypsis
Tripteridia infantilis
Tripteridia latistriga
Tripteridia leucocarpa
Tripteridia monochasma
Tripteridia ni
Tripteridia novella
Tripteridia novenaria
Tripteridia olivaceata
Tripteridia parvipennata
Tripteridia recessilinea
Tripteridia rotundata
Tripteridia scotochlaena
Tripteridia stabilis
Tripteridia subcomosa
Tripteridia synclinogramma
Tripteridia thaumasia
Tripteridia transsecta
Tripteridia vinosa
Tripteridia viridisecta

References

External links
Natural History Museum Lepidoptera genus database

 
Eupitheciini